The 2020–21 Liga I was the 31st season of the top level women's football league of the Romanian football league system. Since the previous season, the league was supposed to be temporarily expanded from 12 to 14 teams, for just this season, since the 2019–20 Coronavirus pandemic forced an early finish to the 2019–20 women's football season in Romania. As such, the 14 teams would have competed in a double round-robin of 26 stages, for a total of 182 matches. Teams ranked 13th and 14th at the end of the season would have relegated, while those ranked 11th and 12th would have faced two teams from the 2020–21 Liga II in play-offs for the 2021–22 Liga I. Round 1 was scheduled to begin on 23 August 2020, but was postponed until 6 September 2020.

However, as two teams withdrew after the initial program was announced since they were unable to comply with medical protocol, a new draw was performed on 26 August 2020. The two teams: CSȘ Târgoviște and Luceafărul Filiași were enrolled instead in 2020–21 Liga II. Along with this new draw, a decision was made to change the play system: the remaining 12 teams will play a single round-robin for the regular season (totaling 66 matches), after which the first six will enter a double round-robin play-off to decide the champion, while the remaining teams (six) will enter a double round-robin play-out to decide the relegated teams. If no further withdrawals occur, the play-off and play-out will consist of 30 games each, for a grand total of 126 matches overall. Teams ranked 11 and 12 (5 and 6 in the play-out) will relegate directly to the 2021–22 Liga II.

U Olimpia Cluj were the defending champions.

Team changes

To Liga I
Promoted from Liga II
 Carmen București (winner of 2019–20 Liga II, Seria I)
 Banat Girls Reșița (winner of 2019–20 Liga II, Seria II)

From Liga I
Relegated/Enrolled in Liga II
 CSȘ Târgoviște (7th place in 2019–20 Liga I)
 Luceafărul Filiași (10th place in 2019–20 Liga I)

Excluded and spared teams
Fair Play București (11th place in 2019–20 Liga I) and Selena ȘN Constanța (12th place in 2019–20 Liga I)
were spared from relegation since the 2019-20 coronavirus pandemic forced an early finish to the 2019–20 women's football season in Romania.

However, CSȘ Târgoviște (7th place in 2019–20 Liga I) and Luceafărul Filiași (10th place in 2019–20 Liga I), despite initially drawn to compete in the current Liga I season, were forced to withdraw and enroll instead in Liga II for being unable to comply with medical protocols.

Renamed teams
After a reorganisation, Independența Baia Mare was renamed to Fotbal Feminin Baia Mare at the conclusion of the 2019–20 season. The change was approved in the Romanian Football Federation's Executive Committee of 3 August 2020.

Stadiums by capacity and location

Regular season

League table

Results

a awarded (game not played)

Championship play-offs
The top six teams from Regular season will meet twice (10 matches per team) for deciding the league champion and the participant in the 2021–22 UEFA Women's Champions League. Teams start the Championship round with their points from the Regular season, but no other records carried over.

Play-off table

Results

a awarded (game not played)

Championship play-out
The bottom six teams from Regular season will meet twice (10 matches per team) for deciding the two relegated teams to the 2021–22 Liga II. Teams start the Play-off round with their points from the Regular season, but no other records carried over.

Play-out table

Results

a awarded (game not played)

Season statistics

Scoring 
Updated to match(es) played on 30 June 2021. Source: frf.ro

Top scorers

Hat-tricks 

Notes
4 Player scored 4 goals
5 Player scored 5 goals
6 Player scored 6 goals
(H) – Home team
(A) – Away team

References

External links
 fotbalfeminin.net 

Rom
Fem
Romanian Superliga (women's football) seasons